The team relay competition in luge at the 2022 Winter Olympics was held on 10 February, at the Xiaohaituo Bobsleigh and Luge Track in Yanqing District. The event was won by Natalie Geisenberger, Johannes Ludwig, Tobias Wendl / Tobias Arlt. All these athletes previously won gold in their corresponding events. In particular, for Geisenberger this was the sixth gold Olympic medal, more than any other luger ever won. Austria, with Madeleine Egle, Wolfgang Kindl, and Thomas Steu / Lorenz Koller, won silver, and Latvia, with Elīza Tīruma, Kristers Aparjods, and Mārtiņš Bots / Roberts Plūme, bronze.

Germany won both previous mixed team relays, at the 2014 and 2018 Olympics, and were leading the 2021–22 Luge World Cup before the Olympics. Latvia were second, and Austria third. In 2018, Canada were second and Austria third, however, after the retirements of Alex Gough and Samuel Edney, Canada were not performing well in the 2021–22 Luge World Cup and were not considered a medal contender.

Canada, starting at number 8, set the track record, to be overtaken by the Russian Olympic Committee, who started at number 8, with four teams to go. Italy could not set the new track record, but Latvia did, taking the lead and ensuring a medal. So did Austria. Germany, a clear favorite, were still losing to the Austrians after the second leg, but Wendl and Arlt were faster and brought the team to the gold medals.

Qualification

All countries qualifying a sled in each of the three individual/doubles events qualified to compete in the relay.

On December 17, 2021, the International Luge Federation announced that the qualification system was changed. The qualification system was changed due to training runs being cancelled at the first World Cup, and equipment not being delivered to the following World Cups. The new system will see athletes qualify based on their top four results during the World Cup season, (as opposed to the previous all seven results counting).

On January 19, 2022 the International Luge Federation announced the list of qualified athletes.

Results

References

Luge at the 2022 Winter Olympics
Mixed events at the 2022 Winter Olympics